The siege of Guadeloupe took place from March to May 1703 during the War of the Spanish Succession, when a British expeditionary force led by Christopher Codrington landed on Guadeloupe in the French West Indies, and laid siege to the capital of Basse-Terre. 

Charles Auger, the French governor, received reinforcements from Martinique led by Nicolas de Gabaret. The latter opted for a Fabian strategy and scorched earth tactics, destroying resources and Fort St Charles in the process. A lack of supplies and heavy losses from disease forced the British to lift the siege in May.

Siege

In March 1703, the British landed on the western part of Guadeloupe, in the French West Indies, near the main settlement of Basse-Terre. Codrington laid siege to Fort St Charles, held by a garrison under Charles Auger, while sending out parties of troops to burn and destroy houses, farms, works and plantations. They were also ordered to forage and plunder, because provisions were in short supply.

Reinforcements arrived from Martinique on 3 April, led by its governor Nicolas de Gabaret who took over command, and blew up the fort. He adopted scorched earth tactics, destroying resources before falling back into the interior, then harassing the British while disease and lack supplies reduced their strength. While highly unpopular with French plantation owners, it proved extremely effective.

By the end of April, disease began afflicting the soldiers ashore and Codrington was evacuated when he too fell ill. His deputy Charles Wills took over command and began evacuating the survivors in early May. Basse-Terre town was set ablaze as the fleet, taking captured guns, sailed on to St Christopher's Island.

References

Sources
 
 
 

Conflicts in 1703
Sieges involving England
Sieges involving France
Battles of the War of the Spanish Succession
Siege
1703 in the Caribbean
1703 in the British Empire
1703 in France
Sieges of the War of the Spanish Succession